Marek Tadeusz Kondrat (born 18 October 1950) is a former Polish TV, film and theatrical actor, director.

Career 
He is a graduate of the Jan Śniadecki High School No. 30 in Warsaw. In 1972, he graduated from the National Academy of Dramatic Art in Warsaw (PWST). He played his first role as a child in 1961 film Historia żółtej ciżemki.

Between 1972-1973, he worked at the Stanisław Wyspiański Silesian Theatre in Katowice. He also worked at the Dramatic Theatre in Warsaw (1973–1984, 1987–1988), French Institute (1984), New Theatre (1985–1986), Comedy Theatre (1989), Za Dalekim (1990), Ateneum Theatre (1992–1999) and Zygmunta Hübner's Theatre (2002).

His most notable roles, which made him one of the most popular actors in Poland, are featured in such films as Janusz Majewski's 1975 film Hotel Pacific, Andrzej Wajda's 1976 film Smuga cienia where he played the role of Joseph Conrad, Krzysztof Zanussi's 1981 biographic film From a Far Country,  Janusz Majewski's 1985 comedy film C.K. Dezerterzy, Kazimierz Kutz's 1996 film Pułkownik Kwiatkowski, Marek Koterski's 2002 film Day of the Wacko and 2006 film We're All Christs. Since 1998 he has been cooperating with ING Bank Śląski.

In 2002, he was awarded the Commander's Cross of the Order of Polonia Restituta.

In the summer of 2006, he read the novel "Casino Royale" on RMF FM. In 2007, he planned to revolutionize the Polish domestic wine market by introducing Winarium wine stores in every city with a population of over 100,000. On March 5, 2007 he announced the end of his acting career, he played the last role in the film Mała matura 1947 (2010). He was the co-author of the book E-lementarz Internet, published in 2009.

He ran a chain of restaurants called "Prohibicja", which he founded with Zbigniew Zamachowski, Wojciech Malajkat and Bogusław Linda. He completed a wine connoisseur course in Bordeaux.

Personal life
On 19 September 2015 he married Antonina Turnau, daughter of Grzegorz Turnau.

Awards
 1979 – Leon Schiller Award
 1979 – Zbigniew Cybulski Award by "Ekran" magazine, 
 1980 – Award for "Zegarek" role, "Igraszki z diabłem", "Sułkowski" at IV Polish TV Festival  in Olsztyn 
 1987 – "Gwiazda Sezonu" at LLF in Łagowie 
 1993 – Award for "Mazep" role in Theatr Ateneum in Warszawie
 1995 – Wiktor (most popular actor)
 1995 – Złota Odznaka w plebiscycie "TeleRzeczpospolitej" – "Złota piątka"  (Gold five)
 1996 – First Place at III "Złota Piątka Telerzypospolitej"  
 1997 – Hand on Stars avenue 
 1997 – "Złota Kaczka" in category: best polish actor; for 1996
 1998 – Wiktor '97 in category: best actor and SuperWiktor '97
 1998 – "TeleKamera 1998", award from "TeleTydzień" readers in category: actors (16 January) 
 1999 – Wiktor '98 in category: best actor (20 February)
 1999 – Statue "Feniks" 
 1999 – 7 May at Piotrowska avenue in Łodz shows Kondrat star
 2003 – "Złota Kaczka" in category: best polish actor; for 2002 (24 February)

Movie awards
 2006 – "The Call of the Toad" – Eagle, Polish movie award 
 2005 – "Trzeci" – Viareggio (MFF) "Platinum Award " for best actor 
 2003 – "Dzień Świra" – Eagle, Polska Nagroda Filmowa w kategorii: best male role
 2002 – "Weiser" – Orzeł, Polska Nagroda Filmowa (nominacja) w kategorii: best male role; for year 2001 
 2002 – "Dzień świra" – Gdynia (Festiwal Polskich Filmów Fabularnych) best male role 
 2001 – "Prawo ojca" – Orzeł, Polska Nagroda Filmowa (nominacja) w kategorii: best male role; for year 2000 
 1999 – "Złoto dezerterów" – Orzeł, Polska Nagroda Filmowa (nominacja) w kategorii: best male role; for year 1998 
 1999 – "Prawo ojca" – Gdynia (FPFF) "Złoty Klakier", nagroda Radia Gdańsk dla reżysera najdłużej oklaskiwanego filmu 
 1999 – "Prawo ojca" – Gdynia (Festiwal Polskich Filmów Fabularnych) Jury award 
 1995 – "Pułkownik Kwiatkowski" – Gdynia (Festiwal Polskich Filmów Fabularnych) best male role 
 1977 – "Zaklęte rewiry" – Panama (MFF)  
 1976 – "Zaklęte rewiry" – Złota Kamera (przyznawana przez pismo "Film")

Filmography
 Maszyna losująca (2007),
 Ryś (2007), as Kreda
 Wszyscy jesteśmy Chrystusami (2006), as Adaś Miauczyński (55)
 The Call of the Toad (2005), as Marczak
 Solidarność, Solidarność... (2005), as Marek ("Sushi")
 Trzeci (2004), as Stary 
 Superprodukcja (2003), as Folksdojcz 
 Haker (2002), as inspektor policji 
 Dzień świra (2002), as Adaś Miauczyński
 Pieniądze to nie wszystko (2001), as Tomasz Adamczyk
 Weiser (2000), as Paweł Heller
 Prawo ojca (1999), jako Michał Kord
 Pan Tadeusz (1999), as Hrabia
 Operacja Samum (1999), as Józef Mayer
 With Fire and Sword (1999) as Jan II Kazimierz Waza
 Kiler-ów 2-óch (1999)
 Bill Diamond (1999)
 Złoto dezerterów (1998)
 Siedlisko (1998)
 Ekstradycja 3 (1998)
 Pułapka (1997)
 Pokój 107 (1997)
 Kiler (1997)
 Słodko gorzki (1996)
 Słaba wiara w opowieści weekendowe (1996)
 Nocne graffiti (1996)
 Ekstradycja 2 (1996)
 Autoportret z kochanką (1996)
 Pułkownik Kwiatkowski (1995)
 Ekstradycja (1995)
 Zawrócony (1994)
 Szczur (1994)
 Panna z mokrą głową (1994)
 Taranthriller (1993)
 Straszny sen Dzidziusia Górkiewicza (1993)
 Skutki noszenia kapelusza w maju (1993)
 Lepiej być piękną i bogatą (1993)
 Koloss (1993)
 Człowiek z ... (1993)
 Wszystko, co najważniejsze (1992)
 Sauna (1992)
 Psy (1992)
 Enak (1992)
 Czy ktoś mnie kocha w tym domu ? (1992)
 V.I.P. (1991)
 Obywatel świata (1991)
 Kuchnia polska (1991)
 Po własnym pogrzebie (1989)
 Po upadku. Sceny z życia nomenklatury (1989)
 Lawa (1989)
 Czarny wąwóz (1989)
 Weryfikacja (1986)
 Mrzonka (1985)
 C. K. Dezerterzy (1985)
 Rok spokojnego słońca (1984)
 Kobieta w kapeluszu (1984)
 Dom wariatów (1984), as Adaś Miauczyński
 Bez końca (1984)
 Pastorale heroica (1983)
 Epitafium dla Barbary Radziwiłłówny (1982)
 Danton (1982)
 Yokohama (1981)
 Dziecinne pytania (1981)
 Dreszcze (1981)
 Człowiek z żelaza (1981)
 Grzechy dzieciństwa (1980)
 Lekcja martwego języka (1979)
 Sprawa Gorgonowej (1977)
 Pokój z widokiem na morze (1977)
 Smuga cienia (1976)
 Zaklęte rewiry (1975)
 Koniec wakacji (1974)
 Między brzegami (1962)
 Historia żółtej ciżemki (1961) as Wawrzek

References

External links
 Official website
 

1950 births
Male actors from Kraków
Living people
Polish child actors
Polish male actors
Polish male stage actors
Polish theatre directors
Polish film actors
Polish film directors
Polish male child actors
Wine merchants
21st-century Polish businesspeople
Aleksander Zelwerowicz National Academy of Dramatic Art in Warsaw alumni